Nguyễn Thị Hinh, popularly known as Bà Huyện Thanh Quan (chu Nom: 婆縣清觀, Lady of the Thanh Quan District Chief) (Vĩnh Thuận, 1805–1848) was a Vietnamese female poet.

Biography 
Nguyễn Thị Hinh was born in Nghi Tàm ward, Vĩnh Thuận district, near Hồ Tây (now Quảng An ward, Tây Hồ district), Hanoi. Her father, Nguyễn Lý (1755-1837), was the valedictorian in 1783, during the reign of Emperor Lê Hiển Tông.

Works 
Bà Huyện Thanh Quan is famous for composing poems in Hán Nôm, some works including,

Crossing Ngang Pass (Qua đèo Ngang, 戈𡸇卬)

References

19th-century Vietnamese poets
1805 births
1848 deaths
19th-century Vietnamese women writers
19th-century Vietnamese writers
Vietnamese women poets
Vietnamese ladies-in-waiting
Nguyễn dynasty poets